Chenkol is a 1993 Indian Malayalam-language action drama film directed by Sibi Malayil and written by A. K. Lohithadas. A sequel to his 1989 film Kireedam, the story continues Sethumadhavan's (Mohanlal) story after his prison term and his life back into society. The movie was produced by Krishnakumar. It also features Thilakan, Surbhi Javeri Vyas, Keerikkadan Jose, and Kaviyoor Ponnamma. The film's music was composed by Johnson. Lohithadas won the Kerala Film Critics Award for Best Script for the film.

Plot
Sethumadhavan is released after serving imprisonment of seven years in central jail for murdering Keerikadan Jose, a hardcore criminal. Though it was by accident, which he did to save his life, the society is not ready to accept it. For them, he is now a hardcore criminal, who had killed someone who ruled the streets for long years. Upon release, Sethu visits the medical college to meet his younger brother Rameshan who is doing a course in medicine. However, Rameshan responds coldly and openly asks Sethu not to make any further visits as it may hurt his reputation.

Sethu realizes that the world around him has undergone a severe change. At home though, his mother Ammu is elated to see him, but his father Achuthan Nair is not too keen on having him at home. Achuthan Nair, who always wanted Sethu to be a police inspector, broke down completely after Sethu's conviction and has turned into an alcoholic. Remorseful, Sethu looks forward to building up a life outside the jail, but he fails to find employment due to the tag of an "ex-convict" labelled on him.

Sethu tries to catch up with his old friend Najeeb, who tells him about the present physical condition of Parameshwaran, whom Sethu had severely assaulted in a bid to save his own life. Fully paralysed, Parameshwaran now runs a cycle repair shop with the help of his wife and daughter. Sethu meets Parameshawaran, who is now a completely changed man. With the help of Parameshwaran, Sethu begins selling fish for a living. Keerikadan Jose had an affair with another woman named Madhavi Varma and had two children, Indu and her brother. The illegitimate wife and children of Keerikadan Jose suffer constant threats from his family after his death. The siblings of Jose, who were looking for a chance to unleash vengeance upon Sethu, attack him violently. He is saved by Indu, who happens to be the illegitimate daughter of Keerikadan Jose. She expresses sympathy for him and encourages him to live a new living. Once, in a bid to escape from the Keerikadan brothers, Sethu beats them up. Achuthan Nair blames Sethu and asks him to stay away from their house, which he agrees to. However, Sethu gradually realizes that for his surroundings, he is still a criminal.

The local police officer warns Sethu for no reason and humiliates him, which creates deep mental anguish in him. Sethu undergoes deep psychological torture, which slowly transforms him into another person. To counter the attacks from Keerikadan's family, Sethu becomes a thug of a local businessman. He slowly becomes a hardcore criminal and has several criminal cases pending in the police station, but he overcomes them with the help of local politicians. With time, his relationship with Indu grows, and he asks her mother for her hand in marriage, which she refuses, flatly citing that he is a criminal whose life has no guarantee. This incident strikes him deeply, and he decides to change. In the meantime, Sethu shockingly finds out that his sister, under the veil of drama acting, is into prostitution, that too with their father acting as the pimp. This deals him a severe mental blow, and he reacts violently to his father. Achuthan Nair, unable to face his son, commits suicide by hanging himself on the ceiling fan of a hotel where the business takes place. Sethu now shifts back to his old village with the rest of his family and starts farming.

Slowly, Madhavi agrees to get Indu married to Sethu, but their teenage son maintains a bitter hatred towards Sethu. Karadi Antony, the younger brother of Keerikadan, is now released from jail and is back to avenge his brother's death. He hunts down Sethu and Indu's family but is killed by Sethu. However, he is shocked when the illegitimate son of Keerikadan (brother of Indu), at this crucial moment, fatally stabs Sethu. Sethu advises him to run away from the spot to save himself, otherwise, he too will end up as another criminal of circumstances. Watching him run away, Sethu closes his eyes. At the time of his death, the tagline shows the following; "The story of a prince who lost his crown and a sceptre ends here".

Cast

 Mohanlal as Sethumadhavan
 Thilakan as Retd Police Head Constable Achuthan Nair, Sethu's father
 Surbhi Javeri Vyas as Indu
 Jojan Kanjany as Karadi Antony
 Usha as Latha, Sethu's younger sister
 Mohan Raj as Keerikkadan Jose, Indu's foster father
 Kaviyoor Ponnamma as Ammu, Achuthan Nair's wife and Sethu's mother
 Sreenath as Keshu, Sethu's friend
 Sankaradi as  Krishnan Nair, Sethu's maternal uncle and Devi's father
 Santhakumari as Bharathi, Krishnan Nair's wife, Devi's mother, and Sethu's aunt
 Cochin Haneefa as Haidrose
 Kundara Johny as Parameshwaran
 Spadikam George as Keerikkadan Thomas, Jose's elder brother  
 Meghanathan as Keerikkadan Sunny, Jose's younger brother
 Mamukkoya as Police Constable Hameed
 Shammi Thilakan as SI John Mathew
 Maniyanpilla Raju as Najeeb, a shopkeeper and Hameed's son
 Shanthi Krishna as Madhavi Varma, Jose's second wife and Indu's mother
 Yadukrishnan as Rameshan, Sethu's youngest brother and a student of medicine
 Kanakalatha as Ambika, Sethu's divorced elder sister
 Nandhu as Ratheesh, Prisoner
 Parvathy Jayaram as Devi, Sethu's cousin and lover, who is deceased (photo presence only)
 Philomina as Krishnan's and Ammu's elderly mother and Sethu's grandmother, who is also deceased (photo presence only)
 Shivaji as Diwakaran
 Kothuku Nanappan

Soundtrack
The songs were composed by Johnson master and lyrics were penned by Kaithapram.

Awards

 Kerala State Film Award for Best Male Playback Singer - Dr. K. J. Yesudas
 Kerala Film Critics Award for Best Script - A. K. Lohithadas

Reception 
The film was released on 10 December 1993. In an interview in August 1997, praising Mohanlal's performance, Lohithadas said that "I feel he performed the best in Chenkol. Then comes Kireedom. And Bharatham comes only later. In Chenkol he surprised me with his expressions. There was an amazing quality in the way he walked, talked and even sat.

References

External links

 

1993 films
1990s Malayalam-language films
Indian sequel films
EKireedom2
Films directed by Sibi Malayil
Films with screenplays by A. K. Lohithadas
Films scored by Johnson
Indian political films